Live at the Keystone Corner is a live album by pianist Tete Montoliu recorded at Keystone Korner in 1979 and released on the Dutch label, Timeless.

Track listing
 "Autumn in New York/Scrapple from the Apple" (Vernon Duke/Charlie Parker) – 10:23	
 "I'll Remember April" (Gene de Paul, Patricia Johnston, Don Raye) – 12:44
 "You've Changed" (Carl T. Fischer, Bill Carey) – 11:12
 "Lady Bird" (Tadd Dameron) – 8:49

Personnel
Tete Montoliu – piano
Herbie Lewis – bass
Billy Higgins – drums

References

Tete Montoliu live albums
1981 live albums
Timeless Records live albums